GreyFriars, Newcastle-upon-Tyne was a friary in Newcastle-upon-Tyne, Tyne and Wear, England, which was founded in Pilgrim Street in 1237, was sold after the Dissolution of the Monasteries, and then rebuilt as a private residence, as New Place and Anderson Place, before being demolished to become Grey Street.

Greyfriars 
The friary was founded, in 1237, in Pilgrim Street, Newcastle-upon-Tyne, and was sold after the Dissolution of the Monasteries.

New Place 

The merchant Robert Anderson purchased the 13 acres of land and on the site of the former Greyfriars building built a private residence (named "Newe House") which was described as a “princely house built out of the ruins of the friars”. In 1646, King Charles I was kept prisoner there by the Scots.

Robert Anderson bequeathed his estate to his kinsman, the Newcastle MP Sir Francis Anderson (1614–79). In 1675, Sir Francis sold "New Place" to Sir William Blackett, 1st Baronet (1657–1705) who added two large wings to the house. The mansion later passed to Sir William's son, Sir William Blackett, 2nd Baronet (1690–1728), and then to the latter's nephew the Newcastle merchant Sir Walter Calverley-Blackett, 2nd Baronet (1707–77). Sir Walter's successor, Sir Thomas Blackett, sold the house in 1782 to the wealthy Newcastle builder, George Anderson (c.1705–98) who converted the residence into three dwellings.

Anderson Place 
In 1801, George Anderson's son, Major George Anderson (1760–1831), came to reside there and changed the name to Anderson Place. On his death in 1831, the houses passed to the Major's cousin, Thomas Anderson (c.1808–72), who sold it to the Newcastle builder Richard Grainger (1797–1861), for £50,000, in 1834. Thomas Anderson and his family moved to live at Little Harle Tower, Kirkwhelpington, Northumberland. Anderson Place was demolished in 1835 as a key part of Grainger's plan to rebuild the city and to allow the construction of new buildings in Grey Street, Newcastle-upon-Tyne.

References

Monasteries in Tyne and Wear